Aidan White may refer to:

Aidy White (born 1991), English footballer (birth name Aidan Peter White)
Aidan White (journalist) (born 1951), Irish journalist